Monchy is a former settlement in Saskatchewan, Canada on the Canada–US border. Monchy is the transition point between Saskatchewan Highway 4 and U.S. Route 191.  Originally a small settlement it is now primarily a border crossing.  On the opposite side of the border is Morgan, Montana.

Monchy was named after Monchy-le-Preux in France in commemoration of WWI battles fought there by Canadian forces.

The border crossing is staffed by the Canada Border Services Agency during the day and closed at night. The border crossing consists of a customs building, residence and three storage buildings Growing pressure exists on both the Canada and US side of the border to expand the border crossing to 24-hour operation,

Notable people
 George Spence - Member of Provincial Legislature (1917–1925, 1927–1938) and Member of Parliament (1925–1927)

References

Val Marie No. 17, Saskatchewan
Unincorporated communities in Saskatchewan
Ghost towns in Saskatchewan
Canada–United States border crossings
Division No. 4, Saskatchewan